Dean Bowyer is a college baseball coach. He has been the coach for Minot State 1973-76 and the Minnesota State Mavericks 1977–2008.

Coaching career

Bowyer has been a successful College Head Coach. He won 1053 games in his 34 years of coaching, putting him 8th winningest Division II coach of all time. He has also taken his teams to the 1979 Division II College World Series, 1980 Division II College World Series, 1986 Division II College World Series and 2010 Division II College World Series.

References

Living people
Mayville State Comets baseball players
Minot State Beavers baseball coaches
Minnesota State Mavericks baseball coaches
Year of birth missing (living people)